Eirplay was an Irish computer game company founded by Peter Lynch. The company developed web and mobile games (J2ME) for a variety of platforms and publishers. It was founded in 2002 and ceased trading in 2009. Eirplay was based in the Digital Hub, Dublin, Ireland. The company published games for both the Irish market and international mobile games marketplace.

Distributors: Handango, AirGames, SSG, Selatra, Eirborne, Trust5

Company legal status: Private limited company

Directors: Michael Lynch; Peter Lynch

Awards 
Sep 2003 - Eirplay wins a commendation award at the Hothouse (Dublin Institute of Technology) Awards for Best Start-up Company.

Jan 2004 - The company wins ‘Game Developer of the Year’ at the O2 Digital Media Awards

Nov 2007 - Eirplay wins the Eircom Web Innovation Award with Playza

References

Video game companies established in 2002
Video game companies disestablished in 2009
Companies based in Dublin (city)
Irish companies established in 2002
2009 disestablishments in Ireland
Defunct video game companies of Ireland